Events from the year 1684 in China.

Incumbents 
 Kangxi Emperor (23rd year)

Events 
 The Kangxi Emperor lifts the haijin prohibition on sea trade, allowing foreigners to enter Chinese ports in 1684
 The amount of copper in the alloys if cash coins was reduced from 70% to 60% all while the standard weight was lowered to 1 qián again, while the central government's mints in Beijing started producing cash coins with a weight of 0.7 qián. 
The first mention of chili peppers in local gazettes in Hunan. They would later become a staple of Hunanese cuisine.
 Sino-Russian border conflicts

Deaths
 Yinju (13 September 1683 – 17 July 1684), 19th son of Kangxi, born through an unnamed Noble Lady, of the Gorolo clan (貴人 郭絡羅氏)
 Mu'an (Japanese Mokuan Shōtō) (1611–1684) a Chinese Chan monk who followed his master Yinyuan Longqi to Japan in 1654

References

 
 .
.

 
China